Höhn is an Ortsgemeinde – a community belonging to a Verbandsgemeinde – in the Westerwaldkreis in Rhineland-Palatinate, Germany.

Geography

Location
With roughly 3,200 inhabitants, Höhn is the biggest Ortsgemeinde in the Verbandsgemeinde of Westerburg – a kind of collective municipality – in the Westerwald. The community offers, at 500 m above sea level, all the attractions and charm of a high plateau, as well as lovely views from almost every part of the community.

Constituent communities
Since 1969, Höhn has consisted of the Ortsteile of Höhn-Urdorf, Oellingen, Schönberg and Neuhochstein. The Ortsteile Höhn-Urdorf, Oellingen and Schönberg have over the last 50 years grown into one another, but in each one's old core, the signs of the structure of the original “clump” villages can be seen. Höhn-Urdorf – “Urdorf” means “original village” – is the community's main centre.

History
In 930, Höhn had its first documentary mention as Hana.

Religion
In Höhn-Urdorf stands the great Catholic parish church Mariä Heimsuchung, which forms the centre of the old village core, as well as an Evangelical church on Bahnhofstraße. In Schönberg is found the Catholic parish church St. Josef.

Politics

Community council
The council is made up of 17 council members, including the mayor (Bürgermeister), who were elected in a municipal election on 13 June 2004.

Mayor
The Mayor of Höhn is Karin Mohr.

Culture and sightseeing
Particular attractions and sightseeing spots are the valley of the river Nister in the north, the natural monument “Hochstein” in Neuhochstein with its unusual basalt formations – and at 525 m also the highest spot in the Westerburger Land – the Catholic parish church Mariä Heimsuchung in Höhn, the parish church St. Josef in Schönberg – a basalt building from 1891, and painted to give its original appearance in 1992 – and the industrial memorial at the marketplace in Höhn.

Winter sport lovers find themselves in their element in Schönberg, home to the Westerwald's longest ski lift at 700 m. In the winter of 2004-2005, 8,000 winter lovers were counted, who had fun skiing, snowboarding or sledding on the varied and well laid out runs. Hiking lovers can, among other things, reach the Wiesensee, an 80-ha lake with an 18-hole golf course on the shores, over well developed hiking trails.

Businesses that supply life's daily needs, such as bakeries, butcher shops and grocer's shops, especially in the shopping park on the Bundesstraße, are just as abundant as the handicraft businesses in Höhn. Also available are two general practitioners, a dentist, a pharmacy, a filling station and several financial institutions.

Gastronomy, which draws food lovers from a broad area around the community, is well represented.

Those inhabitants who work somewhere outside Höhn's many businesses mostly earn their livelihoods in the Westerburg-Bad Marienberg-Rennerod area.

Sport
There are two sports grounds – one near the school in Oellingen and one between Schönberg and Neuhochstein. Furthermore, a ski lift some 700 m long and a chalet are to be found in Schönberg.

In each of Oellingen, Schönberg and Neuhochstein is a village community house. Among other institutions are the mayor's office with sitting room, fire stations, youth centres, graveyards, playgrounds and other public greenspaces.

Economy and infrastructure

Transport
Through Bundesstraße 255, Höhn is linked to Autobahnen A 3 (Cologne–Frankfurt) and A 45 (Dortmund–Aschaffenburg) as well as to the greater centres of Koblenz, Limburg an der Lahn and Herborn.

Education
Höhn is home to a primary school and a Hauptschule, a special school, a kindergarten and one special kindergarten.

The schools are assigned a sport hall, an indoor swimming pool and a sporting ground.

Secondary schools are found in Westerburg, Rennerod and Bad Marienberg.

References

External links
Höhn 
Höhn in the collective municipality’s Web pages 
Catholic parish of Höhn 

Municipalities in Rhineland-Palatinate
Westerwaldkreis